Fransiskus Xaverius Yanuar Wahyu is an Indonesian footballer who currently plays for Persela Lamongan in the Indonesia Super League.

Altercation
On 11 May 2010, when Persela faced Arema Malang in the league at the Kanjuruhan Stadium, he was involved in an on-pitch incident with Arema Malang's Noh Alam Shah. On the 70th minute, he fouled Alam Shah. Then, Alam Shah grabbed Yanuar from behind and Yanuar spun around and knocked Alam Shah down. Both players were sent off. Arema won the match 2-1.

References

Indonesian footballers
1983 births
Living people
Sportspeople from Malang
Persema Malang players
Persela Lamongan players
Liga 1 (Indonesia) players
Association football defenders